Wamego USD 320 is a public unified school district headquartered in Wamego, Kansas, United States.  The district includes the communities of Wamego, Belvue, Louisville, Wabaunsee, Zeandale, and nearby rural areas.

Schools
The school district operates the following schools:
 Wamego High School in Wamego.
 Wamego Middle School in Wamego. 
 Central Elementary School in Wamego.
 West Elementary School in Wamego.

History
Denise O'Dea served as superintendent until she resigned in 2016.

See also
 Kansas State Department of Education
 Kansas State High School Activities Association
 List of high schools in Kansas
 List of unified school districts in Kansas

References

External links
 

School districts in Kansas
Education in Pottawatomie County, Kansas